A Rough Passage is a 1922 Australian silent film directed by Franklyn Barrett based on the novel by Arthur Wright. It was Barrett's final feature and is considered a lost film.

Plot
Laurie Larand (Hayford Hobbs) returns from the war and finds himself jilted and broke. He goes to work for a horse trainer who he discovers to be in league with a book maker to fleece the horse owners.

He also comes across a Shakesperean actor, Poverty Point (Arthur Albert), who becomes his friend, and the beautiful Doiya (Stella Southern), who he falls in love with.

In the finale, Larland exposes the villains and is united with Doris.

Cast
Hayford Hobbs as Laurie Larand
Stella Southern as Doiya Reylen
Elsa Granger as Belle Delair
Gilbert Emery as Jiggy Javitts
Arthur Albert as 'Poverty' Point
Alma Rock Phillips
Robert McKinnon
David Edelsten
Sybil Shirley
Billy Ryan

Original Novel

Arthur Wright's original novel was published in 1921.

Plot
Laurie Larand, a returned soldier, discovers that the barmaid he has entrusted with his money is missing. After a bad day at the races he has no money. He goes to live in the Domain but is helped by a trainer and an actor friend to get back on his feet. He discovers the trainer is in cahoots with bookmakers.

Reception
The novel appears to have been well received. "He shows to advantage as a writer of humor", said one critic. Another stated that, "Not many Australians, perhaps, are writing "literature", but quite a fair number are turning out readable and respectable yarns, and Arthur Wright is one of the number."

Production
The film was made with Wright's close involvement. Hayford Hobbs was an English actor touring Australia when the film was made.

Reception
The movie was distributed by Barrett himself, due in part to his difficulties with the Australasian Films monopoly, and was not widely seen.

Arthur Wright later said the film was:
Produced and photographed excellently by Franklyn Barrett, but bringing little grist to the mill of movie ' picture production. It was a flop financially, as were practically all the latter day local silents, which were never given the chance they deserved. Fate and oversea interests were against the Industry, which went into a decline.
Barrett's company soon wound up and he left filmmaking to go into cinema management.

Critical
The Advertiser called the movie "a delightful comedy-drama" in which Arthur Albert "is excellently cast". The Register called it "a stirring racing film" which "cannot fail to please the most exacting. In addition the comedy in the picture is exceedingly clever, and productive of many hearty laughs." The Launceston Daily Telegraph said that "from the very first moment that the screen reflected the delightful panorama of our bush land I knew that here at last I had found a picture which, would prove worth while the time it had taken to produce."

See also
List of lost films

References

External links

A Rough Passage at National Archives of Australia
A Rough Passage at National Film and Sound Archive
A Rough Passage (novel) at AustLit
A Rough Passage at SilentEra
Story was serialised in 1939 – August 11, August 25, September 1, September 8, September 15, September 22, September 29, October 6, October 13, October 20, October 27, November 3, November 17 

1922 films
Australian drama films
Australian silent feature films
Australian black-and-white films
Lost Australian films
1921 Australian novels
1922 drama films
1922 lost films
Lost drama films
Films directed by Franklyn Barrett
Silent drama films